Draksenić is a village in the municipality of Kozarska Dubica, Republika Srpska, Bosnia and Herzegovina.

History
Draksenić was the site of the largest massacre of Serbs in the municipality of Kozarska Dubica during the WWII genocide carried out by the Ustaše. Croatian Home Guard troops burned the village in January 1942, killing more than 200 people.

References

Populated places in Dubica, Bosnia and Herzegovina